Tyranny refers to a despotically ruled state or society.
 Tyranny (Julian Casablancas + The Voidz album), 2014
 Tyranny (Shadow Gallery album), 1998
 Tyranny (The Generators album), 2001
 Tyranny (Stabilizers album), 1986
 Tyranny (For You), album by Front 242
 "Tyranny", by Prodigy from Hegelian Dialectic
 Tyranny (TV series), an American drama and political thriller web series
 Gene Tyranny (1945-2020), American composer and musician
 Tyranny (video game), 2016 role-playing video game by Obsidian Entertainment

See also
 Taghut (Islamic Terminology for very tyrant beings)
 Tyrant (disambiguation)
 Tyrannus (disambiguation)
 Tyranny of the majority, a theory of majority rule
 Tyranny of numbers, a difficulty in 1960s computer engineering
 Queen Tyr'ahnee, character from the Duck Dodgers television series